The EuroLeague Basketball 2000–10 All-Decade Team consisted of 10 basketball players that were awarded and named to the EuroLeague's All-Decade Team, in recognition of the first 10 years of the league's competition, after coming under the control of the Euroleague Basketball Company competition, between the years 2000 and 2010. The EuroLeague is Europe's premier level men's professional club basketball league.

There were 50 players nominated for the All-Decade Team. Voting included votes from selected media members and fans.

EuroLeague 2000–10 All-Decade Team 50 nominees 
The 50 nominees that were nominated for the All-Decade Team were: 
(Players listed in bold were selected to the 10 man All-Decade Team)

The fan's All-Decade Team vote
Worldwide, fans cast more than 125,000 ballots, as well as about 1.25 million online votes. The results of the fan voting were as follows:
(Players listed in bold were selected to the 10 man All-Decade Team)

The EuroLeague 2000–10 All Decade Team
The All-Decade Team was decided upon by worldwide fan voting, which included more than 125,000 ballots, as well as about 1.25 million online votes, plus 35 media members. Fan voting accounted for 25% of the vote, while media voting accounted for 75% of the vote. The official EuroLeague 2000–10 All-Decade Team, as voted on by both the fans and the media was:

See also
EuroLeague
EuroLeague Awards
EuroLeague 2010–20 All-Decade Team
50 Greatest EuroLeague Contributors (2008)
EuroLeague Legends

References

External links
EuroLeague official website
EuroLeague 2000–10 All-Decade Team Fan Voting

2000–10 All-Decade Team